The 1956 Wisconsin gubernatorial election was held on November 6, 1956. Republican nominee Vernon Wallace Thomson defeated Democratic nominee William Proxmire with 51.89% of the vote.

General election

Candidates
Vernon Wallace Thomson (Republican), Attorney General of Wisconsin since 1951.
William Proxmire (Democrat), member of the Wisconsin State Assembly 1951–53, and Democratic nominee for Wisconsin governor in 1952 and 1954.

Results

References

1956
Wisconsin
Gubernatorial